Thérèse – Vivre d'amour is a concept album of poems by St. Thérèse of Lisieux, with music composed by French musician Grégoire. The album features performances by Natasha St-Pier, Anggun, Sonia Lacen, Elisa Tovati, Les Stentors, Les Petits Chanteurs à la Croix de Bois, and Michael Lonsdale. It was released on 22 April 2013 by Twin Music in France, Belgium, and Switzerland. "Vivre d'amour", a duet by Natasha St-Pier and Anggun, was released as the album's first single on 29 March 2013. In 2014, Thérèse - Vivre d'amour was nominated for a World Music Awards for World's Best Album.

Track listing

Charts and certifications

Charts

Certifications

References

2013 albums
Concept albums